Cómo seducir a una mujer (How to Seduce a Woman) is a 1967 Argentine film directed by Ricardo Alventosa with a screenplay by Ricardo Alventosa and Jose Martinez Suarez.

Cast
Ricardo Espalter as Juan Dominguez
Raimundo Soto as Professor Alex
Fernanda Mistral as Executive
Estela Molly as Investigator
Mercedes Harris as Sirvienta
Claudia Sánchez as Widow
Nacha Guevara as La dama del gatito
Elida Marletta as Prostitute
Alba Múgica as Juan's Mother

References

External links
 

1967 films
Argentine comedy films
1960s Spanish-language films
1960s Argentine films